Brock McGillis (born October 1, 1983) is a Canadian former ice hockey goaltender and LGBT+ advocate. He was among the first professional hockey players to come out as gay.

Playing career 
From 2001 to 2002, McGillis played in the Ontario Hockey League with the Windsor Spitfires and the Sault Ste. Marie Greyhounds. After playing for a season with the Kalamazoo Wings in the United Hockey League (UHL), he left North America to play in the Netherlands.

From 2009 to 2010, he played at Concordia University in Montréal.

Activism 
In November 2016, McGillis came out as gay. He has been an activist for LGBT+ issues with regard to North American ice hockey.

McGillis has also contributed a chapter to Bob Mackenzie's book Every Hockey Heroes. He appeared in the book Proud To Play, featuring LGBTQ+ athletes in Canada. He graced the cover of and featured in the September/October 2018 issue of IN Magazine.

McGillis has also appeared on Canadian television, including CBC News program The National, CTV's Your Morning, ET Canada Pride, and the Global National newscast. He shared the stage with Richard Branson and Billy Porter at the 2019 New York City WorldPride.

In 2020, the Toronto Maple Leafs became the first NHL team to work with him, hiring him to run a virtual workshop about homophobia for Maple Leafs personnel.

In January 2022, McGillis announced the launch of Alphabet Sports Collective, an organization to support LGBTQ+ people in hockey.

References

External links 

Brock McGillis - Official website

1983 births
Living people
Canadian ice hockey goaltenders
Sportspeople from Greater Sudbury
LGBT ice hockey players
Canadian expatriate ice hockey players in the Netherlands
Concordia Stingers ice hockey players
Kalamazoo Wings (UHL) players
Windsor Spitfires players
Sault Ste. Marie Greyhounds players
Canadian LGBT sportspeople
Canadian LGBT rights activists
21st-century Canadian LGBT people